Henry Schoellkopf Reuss (February 22, 1912 – January 12, 2002) was a Democratic U.S. Representative from Wisconsin.

Early life
Henry Schoellkopf Reuss was born in Milwaukee, Wisconsin.  He was the son of Gustav A. Reuss (pronounced Royce) and Paula Schoellkopf (b. 1876).   He was the grandson of a Wisconsin bank president who had emigrated to the United States from Germany in 1848.  Both his mother and uncle, Henry Schoellkopf (1879–1912), were grandchildren of Jacob F. Schoellkopf (1819–1899), a pioneer in harnessing the hydroelectric power of Niagara Falls.

He grew up in Milwaukee's German section. Reuss earned his A.B. from Cornell University in 1933 and was a member of the Sphinx Head Society. He then earned his LL.B. from Harvard Law School in 1936.

Career
He was a lawyer in private practice and business executive. He served as assistant corporation counsel for Milwaukee County, Wisconsin from 1939 to 1940 and Counsel for United States Office of Price Administration from 1941 to 1942.

World War II
He was in the United States Army from 1943 to 1945, leaving as a major. He was awarded the Bronze Star for his service in the infantry. He served as chief of price control, Office of Military Government for Germany in 1945, and deputy general counsel for the Marshall Plan, Paris, France in 1949. After the War, Reuss became a special prosecutor for Milwaukee County in 1950.

Political career
In 1950, he left the Republican party due to his antipathy towards Senator Joseph McCarthy.  As a Democrat, Reuss waged an unsuccessful primary election campaign to become McCarthy's opponent in the 1952 general election.  He attended the 1952 Democratic National Convention as an alternate delegate.

He served as member of the school board for Milwaukee from 1953 to 1954. He served as member of legal advisory committee, United States National Resources Board from 1948 to 1952. He was an unsuccessful candidate for mayor of Milwaukee in 1948 and 1960, losing to Frank Zeidler and Henry Maier, respectively.

Reuss was elected as a Democrat from the 5th district to the Eighty-fourth and to the thirteen succeeding Congresses (January 3, 1955 – January 3, 1983). He served as chairman of the Committee on Banking, Currency, and Housing in the Ninety-fourth Congress. He served as chairman of the Committee on Banking, Finance, and Urban Affairs in the Ninety-fifth and Ninety-sixth Congresses. He served as chairman of the Joint Economic Committee in the Ninety-seventh Congress.  Among many aides, most key were Donald and Sara Robinson throughout his Congressional career.

With a powerful intellect and gift for explaining complex economic issues in easily-understood, pithy remarks, Reuss was frequently sought out by the Democratic leadership and candidates to comment on policies and actions of the Nixon and Ford Administrations. That and his chairmanship of the House Government Operations Subcommittee on Conservation & the Environment made him a hero to liberals and progressives. 

After the 1974 post-Watergate Democratic landslide victories in Congress, Reuss defeated the more senior Wright Patman of Texas as chairman of the House Banking Committee.  He opposed the war in Vietnam, and supported the campaign of U.S. Senator Eugene J. McCarthy for the 1968 Democratic presidential nomination.  He  served as an at-large delegate for McCarthy at the Democratic National Convention that year.

Later career
He was not a candidate for reelection to the Ninety-eighth Congress in 1982.  After retiring from Congress, he continued to donate to Democratic campaigns, including to Senator Russ Feingold's and Paul Tsongas's campaigns in 1992.  Mrs. Reuss was also an active donor to Democrats and related groups.

Personal life

In 1942, he married Margaret Magrath (c. 1920–2008).  She was an alumna of Bryn Mawr College who earned a master's degree from the University of Chicago in 1944, and a Ph.D. from George Washington University in 1968, both in economics.  She worked at the Office of Price Administration in the 1940s, and taught at Federal City College from 1970.  University of District of Columbia took over FCC in 1977, and she continued teaching there until she retired in 1985, as department chairman.  She served mayor Marion Barry in several capacities, supported the Community for Creative Non-Violence, Emily's List, and various Democrats.  They had four children, seven grandchildren, and eight great-grandchildren.

Legacy
For 20 years, beginning in 1983, a 14-story office building in Milwaukee was named Reuss Plaza Federal Office Building (It was later called The Blue and since 2019, 310W.)  The National Park Service's Henry Reuss Ice Age Center is located near Dundee, Wisconsin.

References
Notes

Sources

  (inspired the Ice Age Trail in Wisconsin).

External links

 https://www.nytimes.com/1982/12/07/us/rep-reuss-looking-back-on-28-years-in-the-house.html
 https://www.nytimes.com/2002/01/15/us/henry-reuss-liberal-in-congress-dies-at-89.html

|-

|-

1912 births
2002 deaths
20th-century American politicians
American people of German descent
American prosecutors
Cornell University alumni
Democratic Party members of the United States House of Representatives from Wisconsin
Harvard Law School alumni
Lawyers from Milwaukee
Military personnel from Milwaukee
Politicians from Milwaukee
Schoellkopf family
School board members in Wisconsin
United States Army officers
United States Army personnel of World War II
University School of Milwaukee alumni